The men's 3000 metres steeplechase at the 2017 Asian Athletics Championships was held on 8 July.

Results

References
Results

5000
Steeplechase at the Asian Athletics Championships